ReTuna Återbruksgalleria (ReTuna Reuse Gallery, or simply ReTuna) is a shopping mall in Eskilstuna, Sweden, which exclusively sells second hand and recycled goods. It is situated next to the town's recycling center, and has 3,000 m2 of shopping space occupied by 14 shops, including a sports goods store, electronics outlet, fashion boutique, gardening center, and toy store. 
The mall averages over 700 visitors a day and a turnover of $1.8 million a year.

References

External links 
 ReTuna Återbruksgalleria

 

Recycling
Shopping centres in Sweden
Shopping malls established in 2015